Robert Bruce Duncan  (born 19 November 1931) is an Australian rower. He competed in the men's coxed pair event at the 1956 Summer Olympics.

Duncan was awarded the Medal of the Order of Australia (OAM) in the 2023 Australia Day Honours for "service to rowing".

References

1931 births
Living people
Australian male rowers
Olympic rowers of Australia
Rowers at the 1956 Summer Olympics
Place of birth missing (living people)
Recipients of the Medal of the Order of Australia